Phryganodes eradicalis is a moth in the family Crambidae. It was described by George Hampson in 1908. It is found on the Andaman Islands in Indonesia and in Singapore.

References

Spilomelinae
Moths described in 1908